The Geibel House, at 327 N. Main St. in Henderson, Kentucky, was built in 1896.  It has also been known as L & N Bed and Breakfast.  It was listed on the National Register of Historic Places in 1998.

The building is Italianate in style.

References

National Register of Historic Places in Henderson County, Kentucky
Italianate architecture in Kentucky
Houses completed in 1896
1896 establishments in Kentucky
Houses on the National Register of Historic Places in Kentucky
Bed and breakfasts in Kentucky
Henderson, Kentucky